Someday Everything Will Be Fine is the fifth studio album by American alternative rock band Spider Bags. It was released on August 3, 2018, by Merge Records.

Production
The album was recorded at Bunker Audio in Memphis, Tennessee, with producer Andrew McCalla, and features collaborations with Jack Oblivian, John Whittemore, Jana Misener, Krista Wroten-Combest, Patrick Stickles and Matthew Hoopengardner.

Release
On June 20, 2018, Spider Bags announced the release of their fifth studio album, along with the single "Cop Dream/Black Eye".

On July 30, 2018, the music video to "Oxcart Blues" was released, with director Malachi Cull.

Critical reception
Someday Everything Will Be Fine was met with "universal acclaim" reviews from critics. At Metacritic, which assigns a weighted average rating out of 100 to reviews from mainstream publications, this release received an average score of 81 based on 7 reviews. Aggregator Album of the Year gave the release a 75 out of 100 based on a critical consensus of 6 reviews.

Mark Deming of AllMusic noted how the band sounded a "little less punk and a bit more rock" on the release, while explaining the album "is an object lesson in how maturity and progress don't have to be the enemies of snarky, passionate rock & roll, and this is music that satisfies on several levels at once." Barry Vitus from Blurt gave the release five out of five stars, explaining that it "injected a new, creative energy into the band. The chemistry imbued by the helping hands and producer were significant to the end product." Writer Michael Hann of The Guardian gave the album four out of five stars, noting "their fifth album sound more of-the-moment than the previous four, not least because its opening track, Reckless, perfectly embodies that heavy, heavy slacker sound."

Track listing

Personnel

Band members
 Dan McGee – guitar, vocals
 Steve Oliva – bass, backing vocals
 Gregg Levy – guitar
 Rock Forbes – drums

Additional musicians
 Jerry Hayes – backing vocals
 Joseph Plunket – backing vocals
 Patrick Stickles – backing vocals, guitar
 Seth Moody – clavinet
 Jack Oblivian – guitar
 Tahr McGee – piano
 Jana Misener – backing vocals, cello
 Matt Hoopengardner – backing vocals, guitar
 Krista Wroten-Combest – violin, backing vocals

Production
 Andrew McCalla – engineer, mixing, producer
 Wesley Wolfe – mastering, mixing

References

2018 albums
Merge Records albums